Yeshiva Beth Yehudah is a religious Jewish day school consisting of two campuses at Southfield and Oak Park, Michigan, which serves boys (Southfield, grades 1–8) and girls (Oak Park, pre-K–12).  The school's curriculum is a blend of traditional secular studies and religious studies. The school is a partner agency of the Jewish Federation of Metropolitan Detroit.

 it is the largest Jewish primary and secondary day school in the Detroit area. The yeshiva has a companion kollel with 30 postgraduate students.

History
In August 1914, Rabbi Yehuda Leib Levin started the school as an afternoon Talmud Torah in the Mogen Avrohom Synagogue on Farnsworth Street, meeting five days a week. By 1923 the school, with 35 students, relocated to Beth Tefilo Emanuel Synagogue on Twelfth Street, and instituted a full-day school curriculum. In 1925, the school was renamed Yeshiva Beth Yehudah after Levin's death. The school moved several more times until 1940 when it occupied a new building on Dexter and Cortland. At this point, enrollment was at 162 students divided into six grade levels.

In 1943, the Beth Jacob School for Girls was established. Rabbi M. J. Wohlgelernter became Yeshiva Beth Yehudah's first President and Rabbi Simcha Wasserman was appointed Dean. Brothers Wolf and Isadore Cohen were founding members of the Yeshiva, with each of them taking a turn as President. In 1944, Rabbi A. A. Freedman moved to Detroit from New York City at the urging of the illustrious leader of the Torah Umesorah Day School movement, Rabbi Shraga Feivel Mendelowitz. Freedman became the inspiration and impetus for the growth of the Yeshiva, actively recruiting new students.

Throughout the 1950s and 60s, the school flourished in Detroit, until it moved to its current location, on Lincoln Road in Southfield. Many educators became involved with the yeshiva, including Rabbi S. P. Wohlgelernter, who succeeded his brother as the school's President; Rabbi Leib Bakst, who served as Rosh Yeshiva until 1989; and Rabbi Sholom Goldstein, who was the principal of the Beth Jacob School for Girls from 1966 until his untimely death in 1984.

In 1976, through the generosity of Mr. Norman Allan, Yeshiva Beth Yehudah purchased a building in Beverly Hills to house the Beth Jacob School for Girls. Around the same time, the Saltsman New Americans Program was launched in response to the influx of Russian immigrants to the community.

In 1991, Gary Torgow was elected President of the Yeshiva Beth Yehudah. Elected with him was Dr. Maury Ellenberg, Chairman of The Board. A new set of institutional by-laws was created and approved by 95% of the communities voters. This vote signified a new direction for the institution which was suffering tremendously from a failing financial base and little institutional oversight.

Circa 1990 the school began leasing the former B’nai Moshe School for Girls site, which had been acquired by United Jewish Charities; the B'nai Moshe School relocated to West Bloomfield Township in that year.

In late 1991 the Jewish Federation of Metropolitan Detroit agreed to purchase the Bnei Moshe Synagogue in Oak Park for the benefit of Yeshiva's girls' school. The Beth Jacob school moved to the newly renovated Bnei Moshe Synagogue in Oak Park directed and led by Rabbi Bunny Freedman, who was responsible for fundraising and coordination of the move.

In 1993, Freedman left the yeshiva and Rabbi Eli Mayerfeld was named Executive Director. He served for 22 years and oversaw the growth of Beth Yehudah from a 400-student day school (pre-K–12), to a full-service educational institution for more than 850 children and 2,500 adults of the broader Detroit Jewish community. A large portion of Mayerfeld's success is attributed to the great fundraising achievements of businessman Rabbi Binyomin Adler, who was hired in 2001 to propel the yeshiva's base.

In the eleven years after 1993, the Oak Park building underwent three expansions: the addition of the Abner Wolf High School wing, the Hannah Karbal educational wing, and the Meer Family Gymnasium.

In 1993, the boys' facility in Southfield was refurbished and expanded to include a new office complex and gymnasium. The building was renamed in honor of Milton and Lois Shiffman.

In 1994, Rabbi Avraham Cohen was appointed Dean of Yeshiva Beth Yehudah and Rabbi Nathaniel Lauer was named Educational Director of the Beth Jacob School for Girls.

In 1999, Cohen became Director of the Partners in Torah Adult Education Program and Rabbi Avrohom Fishman were appointed Principal of the Boys' School and Dean of Yeshiva Beth Yehudah. Also in 1999, the yeshiva broke ground on the Meer Early Childhood Center, a freestanding licensed daycare facility for the yeshiva's preschool classes. It served over 150 three-, four- and five-year-olds with a preschool program.

In 2010, after the death of Rabbi Fishman, Rabbi Yitzchok Grossbard was named Dean of the institution overseeing all divisions of the yeshiva and Beth Jacob. Rabbi Zev Poss was named Principal of the Beth Jacob and Rabbi Aryeh Cohen was named Principal of the boys' division.

In 2012, Rabbi Bentzy Schechter was named Director of Partners Detroit overseeing the famed Tuesday night chavrusa learning program and hundreds of other activities.

The school began construction on a girls' K-8 facility in Oak Park in the former B'nai Moshe site in 2018.

Operations
Yeshiva Beth Yehudah is the largest Jewish School system in Michigan, 
providing Torah-based and secular educational programs for over 100 years. Under its guidance, over 1,000 students in Nursery through Grade 12 receive an education.

The school includes the Norma Jean & Edward Meer Early Childhood Development Center next to the boys' school.

The yeshiva is known locally for its annual fund-raising dinner, held at the Detroit Renaissance Center, which usually features a guest speaker of national prominence.  Previous guests include President George W. Bush, First Lady Laura Bush, President Joe Biden, Governor Jeb Bush, Secretary of State Hillary Clinton, Secretary of State Condoleezza Rice, Secretary of the Treasury Robert Rubin, New York Governor Andrew Cuomo, New York Mayor Rudy Giuliani, Republican Presidential nominee John McCain, Secretary of State John Kerry, and George Stephanopoulos. Many of the area's prominent political figures have attended the dinner, including the previous governor Jennifer Granholm, as well as the new Governor Rick Snyder, the previous Michigan Attorney General Mike Cox, current Attorney General Bill Schuette, Senator Debbie Stabenow, Senator Carl Levin, Senator Gary Peters, federal and state legislators, and Michigan Supreme Court Justices.

References

External links
 DetroitYeshiva.org
 

Jewish day schools in Michigan
Private high schools in Michigan
Orthodox yeshivas in the United States
1914 establishments in Michigan
Educational institutions established in 1914
Private middle schools in Michigan
Private elementary schools in Michigan
Jews and Judaism in Michigan